Marz or März is a German surname. It may refer to:

Heiko März (born 1965), German footballer
Jonas Marz (born 1989), German footballer
Kurt Marz (born 1924), Austrian rower and Olympics competitor
Richard Marz (born 1944), Canadian politician
Ron Marz (born 1965), American comic book writer
Roswitha März (born 1940), German mathematician and writer
Tommy Marz (born ?), American singer-songwriter and guitarist
Tyler Marz (born 1992), American football player

See also
Marz (rapper) (born ?), Croatian-born American rapper
Marz Lovejoy (born ?), American hip hop musician and rapper
Martz (surname), a similarly spelled surname

German-language surnames